The 1965 Sacramento State Hornets football team represented Sacramento State College—now known as California State University, Sacramento—as a member of the Far Western Conference (FWC) during the 1965 NCAA College Division football season. Led by fifth-year head coach Ray Clemons, Sacramento State compiled an overall record of 3–7 with a mark of 1–4 in conference play, placing fifth in the FWC. For the season the team was outscored by its opponents 171 to 115. The Hornets played home games at Hornet Field in Sacramento, California.

Schedule

References

Sacramento State
Sacramento State Hornets football seasons
Sacramento State Hornets football